In Greek mythology, the name Cleoboea (Ancient Greek: Κλεόβοια) refers to:

Cleoboea, daughter of Criasus and Melantho, sister of Phorbas and Ereuthalion.
Cleoboea, mother of Eurythemis. Her daughter was married to King Thestius of Pleuron in Aetolia. Cleoboea herself is otherwise unknown.
Cleoboea, mother of Philonis by Eosphoros. Philonis, in her turn, became the mother of Philammon by Apollo.
Cleoboea, who was said to have been the first to have brought the orgies of Demeter to Thasos from Paros. Pausanias describes a painting which portrays her and Tellis, grandfather of the poet Archilochus, both as young people, on board the boat, with a chest in Cleoboea's hands which is supposed to contain some objects sacred to Demeter.
Cleoboea or Philaechme, wife of Phobius (son of Hippocles and a descendant of Neleus). Her husband ruled over Miletus. A noble young man named Antheus was sent to Phobius from Halicarnassus as hostage. He was so handsome that Cleoboea immediately fell in love with the young man and tried to seduce him, but he rejected her advances. Her passion then took an evil turn and she plotted vengeance on him. She chased a tame partridge (or threw a pot of gold) down a deep well and asked Antheus to fetch it out for her. When he was inside, she pushed a large stone down the well and killed him. Soon after that, overcome with remorse, she hanged herself.

Notes

References 

 Apollodorus, The Library with an English Translation by Sir James George Frazer, F.B.A., F.R.S. in 2 Volumes, Cambridge, MA, Harvard University Press; London, William Heinemann Ltd. 1921. . Online version at the Perseus Digital Library. Greek text available from the same website.
Conon, Fifty Narrations, surviving as one-paragraph summaries in the Bibliotheca (Library) of Photius, Patriarch of Constantinople translated from the Greek by Brady Kiesling. Online version at the Topos Text Project.
Parthenius, Love Romances translated by Sir Stephen Gaselee (1882-1943), S. Loeb Classical Library Volume 69. Cambridge, MA. Harvard University Press. 1916.  Online version at the Topos Text Project.
 Parthenius, Erotici Scriptores Graeci, Vol. 1. Rudolf Hercher. in aedibus B. G. Teubneri. Leipzig. 1858. Greek text available at the Perseus Digital Library.
 Pausanias, Description of Greece with an English Translation by W.H.S. Jones, Litt.D., and H.A. Ormerod, M.A., in 4 Volumes. Cambridge, MA, Harvard University Press; London, William Heinemann Ltd. 1918. . Online version at the Perseus Digital Library
Pausanias, Graeciae Descriptio. 3 vols. Leipzig, Teubner. 1903.  Greek text available at the Perseus Digital Library.

Women in Greek mythology
Aetolian characters in Greek mythology